Gonium is a genus of colonial algae, a member of the order Chlamydomonadales.  Typical colonies have 4 to 16 cells, all the same size, arranged in a flat plate, with no anterior-posterior differentiation.  In a colony of 16 cells, four are in the center, and the other 12 are on the four sides, three each. A description by G.M. Smith (1920, p. 94): 
Gonium Mueller 1773:  Colonies of 4-8-16 cells arranged in a flat quadrangular plate and embedded in a common gelatinous matrix or connected by broad gelatinous strands. Cells ovoid to pyriform, with a single cup-shaped chloroplast containing one pyrenoid. Each cell with two cilia of equal length, contractile vacuoles at the base of the cilia, and an eyespot. Four- and eight-celled colonies with the cilia on the same side ; sixteen-celled colonies with the four central cells having their cilia on the same side and the twelve marginal cells with radially arranged cilia.

Asexual reproduction by simultaneous division of all cells in the colony to form autocolonies, or by a formation of 2-4 zoospores in each cell.

Sexual reproduction isogamous, by a fusion of biciliate zoogametes.

Evolution
The genus Gonium represents species closely related to single celled Chlamydomonas and multicellular differentiated Volvox.  The order Volvocales has long been a well recognized model system for the study of multicellular evolution.  Gonium and the family Tetrabaenaceae contain species representative of colony formation among unicells.  Gonium'''s morphology of colonies of alike cells suggest it is more genetically similar to Chlamydomonas than Volvox, a fact confirmed by phylogenetic analysis.

The Volvocales have been hypothesized to have evolved in twelve discrete steps.  Gonium represents the first six evolutionary steps of multicellularity; (1) incomplete cytokinesis, (2) partial inversion, (3) rotation of the basal bodies,  (4) organismal polarity, (5) transformation of the cell wall into extra-cellular matrix (ECM), (6) genetic control of cell number.  Although the exact order and progression through David Kirk's twelve steps of multicellular evolution  are probably not necessarily linear and each occurs more dynamically than originally thought.

Life cycleGonium being evolutionarily related to Chlamydomonas has a life cycle that is derivative of that of Chlamydomonas. Gonium cells grow asexually as colonies of either 4, 8 or 16 colonial cells.  Cell and colony growth of Gonium is uncoupled from cell division just like Chlamydomonas and each cell within the colony divides by multiple-fission.  Thus, each cell within the colony will divide 2, 3 or 4 times, thus producing 2"n" daughter cells, or 4, 8 or 16 cells within the colony.  Unlike Chlamydomonas where each of the daughter cells separate from each other, Gonium daughter cells remain attached to each other in their ECM.

The sexual cycle of Gonium is also very similar to that of Chlamydomonas.  The sexual program of Gonium is induced by nitrogen deprivation where each vegetative cell within the colony differentiates in gametes.  Gonium gametes are isogomous, or equal-sized, and unicellular.  Thus unicellular Gonium gametes break apart from the multicellular colonies when the sexual program is initiated.  Also like Chlamydomonas, there are two "sexes", plus or minus controlled by a genes homologous  to those found in Chlamydomonas and Volvox''.

References

External links
 Gonium - Description with pictures
 Michod Lab - Research overview of Dr. Richard Michod at the University of Arizona who studies multicellular evolution and whose lab published a detailed phylogenetic tree of the Volvocales
 VIP - The Volvocales Information Project led by Dr. Aurora M. Nedelcu at University of New Brunswick
 Olson Lab  - Dr. Bradley Olson at Kansas State University who studies multicellular evolution with methods for growing Gonium
 Nozaki Lab - Dr. Hisayoshi Nozaki at the University of Tokoyo who studies multicellular evolution and has cultured many Volvocales strains, including Gonium
 Hallman Lab - Dr. Armin Hallman at Bielefeld University whose lab developed a method for transforming Gonium
 
 UTEX - The UTEX algal culture collection which houses many Gonium strains including pictures
 CCAP - The CCAP algal culture collection which houses many Gonium strains including pictures

Chlamydomonadales genera
Chlamydomonadales